Marco Hösli (born 15 May 2000) is a Swiss curler from Ennenda. He is a two-time World Junior silver medallist.

Career

Juniors
Hösli skipped Team Switzerland, which also included Philipp Hösli, Marco Hefti and Jannis Spiess at the 2019 World Junior Curling Championships. There, he led Switzerland to a 6–3 round robin record. This put them into the playoffs, where they had to play the undefeated Scotland team, skipped by Ross Whyte in the semifinal. Switzerland upset the Scots, putting them into the final against Canada, skipped by Tyler Tardi. Canada beat Switzerland, forcing Hösli and his rink to settle for silver.

The next season, Hösli played for Team Switzerland at the 2020 World Junior Curling Championships, starting the event as the alternate on the team, which was originally skipped by Yves Wagenseil. After the first four games, Hösli took over as skip. The team finished the round robin with a 5–4 record. In the playoffs, the team once again upset Scotland (this time skipped by James Craik) in the semifinal, before losing to Canada (skipped by Jacques Gauthier) in the final.

Men's
Hösli and his rink of Philipp Hösli, Justin Hausherr and Spiess played in the 2020 Swiss Men's Curling Championship, where they went 1–5. The following season, the team won the Murom Classic World Curling Tour event.

In 2021, Hösli added Marco Hefti as his team's second, replacing Spiess, with Hausherr moving to lead on the team. In the Swiss men's national championships 2021, Hösli and his team won the bronze medal for third place. The team started the 2021–22 curling season by winning two of their first three World Curling Tour events, the Adelboden International and the WCT Tallinn Mens International Challenger.

Hösli will represent Switzerland at the 2021 Winter Universiade.

Teams

Grand Slam record

References

External links
 

Living people
2000 births
Swiss male curlers
People from Glarus